Louis Spohr's String Quartet No. 19 ("Quatuor brillant") in A major, Op. 68, was composed by Spohr in 1823. Like a concerto, the work is designed to display a soloist's skills, but in a more intimate setting than the concert hall.

Movements
This quartet is in three movement form:
Allegro moderato
Larghetto
Rondo: Allegretto

References

External links
 

19
1823 compositions
Compositions in A major